Earl Thomas (born 1989) is a professional American football player, who plays in the defensive back position

Earl Thomas may refer to:

Earl Thomas (basketball) (1915–1989), American professional basketball player
Earl Thomas (wide receiver) (1948–2020), professional American football player
Earl Thomas (musician) (born 1960), American blues and soul singer

See also
Earle Thomas, New Zealand international football (soccer) player
Earlie Thomas (born 1945), American footballer
 Earl Thomas Conley, country music singer